The 1979-80 season was the first season that the Red Wings played at their at the time newly built arena, the Joe Louis Arena.

Offseason

Regular season

Final standings

Schedule and results

Game 28 would be the last game ever played in the Detroit Olympia.
Game 33 would be the first ice hockey game ever played in the Joe Louis Arena.
As a result, the Red Wings were forced on a four-game road trip from December 16 to 26.

Playoffs
The Red Wings failed to qualify for the playoffs.

Player statistics

Regular season
Scoring

Goaltending

Note: GP = Games played; G = Goals; A = Assists; Pts = Points; +/- = Plus-minus PIM = Penalty minutes; PPG = Power-play goals; SHG = Short-handed goals; GWG = Game-winning goals;
      MIN = Minutes played; W = Wins; L = Losses; T = Ties; GA = Goals against; GAA = Goals-against average;  SO = Shutouts;

Awards and records

Transactions

Draft picks
Detroit's draft picks at the 1979 NHL Entry Draft held at the Queen Elizabeth Hotel in Montreal, Quebec.

Farm teams

See also
1979–80 NHL season
 1980 in Michigan

References

External links

Detroit Red Wings seasons
Detroit
Detroit
National Hockey League All-Star Game hosts
Detroit Red
Detroit Red